Tetracyclopropylmethane is an organic compound, a polycyclic hydrocarbon with formula C13H20, or (C3H5-)4C. The carbon skeleton of its molecule consists of four cyclopropane rings attached to a central carbon atom.

This compound was synthesized in 2001 by Armin de Meijere and others, with dicyclopropyldiethenylmethane as an intermediate step.  In the solid state, the molecules have a propeller shape with S4 symmetry.

References

Cyclopropanes